This is a list of broadcast television stations licensed to cities in the U.S. state of New York.

Full-power stations
VC refers to the station's PSIP virtual channel. RF refers to the station's physical RF channel.

Defunct full-power stations
Channel 10: WVET-TV - CBS/ABC - Rochester (11/1/1953-8/1961, shared time with WHEC-TV)
Channel 17: WBUF - NBC - Buffalo (8/17/1953-9/30/1958)
Channel 18: WECT - Elmira (9/30/1953-5/26/1954)
Channel 24: WTVE - ABC/CBS/DuMont/NBC - Elmira (6/1/1953-10/15/1954 and 5/6/1956-2/13/1957)
Channel 26: WNYP - Ind. - Jamestown (11/27/1967-4/?/1969)
Channel 26: WTJA - Ind. - Jamestown (9/24/1988-1991)
Channel 29: WCDB - satellite of WCDA Albany - Hagaman (4/2/1956-12/31/1958)
Channel 35: WTRI (first incarnation) - Albany (2/19/1954-1/31/1955)
Channel 35: WTRI (second incarnation) - Albany (6/15/1956-8/1/1963, satellite of WAST from 1/1/1959)
Channel 41: WCDA - Albany (2/19/1954-7/31/1963, satellite of WTEN from 12/13/1957)
Channel 43 (RF channel 44): WNYS-TV - Ind./UPN/The WB/MyNetworkTV (TheCoolTV/getTV on DT2) - Syracuse (10/26/1989-1/14/2020)
Channel 52: WNYI (first incarnation) - UNI - Ithaca/Syracuse (2002-2009)
Channel 59: WBES-TV - Buffalo (9/5/1953-12/18/1953)
Channel 66: WKNY-TV - Kingston (4/23/1954-7/25/1956)

LPTV stations

Translators

See also 
 MSG (TV channel)
 MSG Plus
 News 12 Networks
 NYC Media
 Queens Public Television
 SportsNet New York
 YES Network
 List of Spanish-language television networks in the United States

Bibliography
 

New York

Televisionstations